Sean Tan Li Hao (born January 20, 1996) is a Singaporean professional wrestler. He is currently signed to  WWE where he performs on the NXT  brand, under the ring name Dante Chen. He is best known for being the first Singaporean and Southeast Asian wrestler to sign with the WWE.

Early life 
Tan was born in Singapore on January 20, 1996. As a child, he was introduced to professional wrestling through the WWE video games, by his elder brother. After becoming a fan of the games he would begin to watch WWE, and eventually fall in love with professional wrestling. Tan wanted to become the first Singaporean professional wrestler but was shocked to find out that Andruew Tang had already claimed this title. After running into Tang at a gym, he would learn of Singapore Pro Wrestling and would eventually join as a trainee in 2013. At first, Tan's parents were not supportive of his wrestling desire as they believed it was violent, however after learning of Tan's success they eventually became supportive. From 2015 to 2017, Tan served in the Singapore Armed Forces for two years as part of his national service commitments. He studied business at ITE College West, and subsequently studied for a diploma in health management and promotion at Republic Polytechnic in 2020.

Professional wrestling career

Singapore Pro Wrestling (2013-2021)

Early career and Onslaught (2013-2016) 
Tan joined Singapore Pro Wrestling (SPW) in January 2013, as a trainee after running into SPW founder Andruew Tang at a gym. Tan debuted under the ring name Trexxus on the 31st of January at SPW New Year Rumble, facing Sebastian Turini. His debut was after just 4 weeks of training, earning him the national record for the fastest debut. Trexxus would hold that record for over 9 years until it was beaten by Varun Khanna in 2022. In 2014 he teamed with "The Statement" Andruew Tang, forming a tag team known as Onslaught. The duo would win the inaugural SPW Tag Team Championship, defeating MK & Affi at SPW: Breakthrough. Onslaught would defend their title against Bit Man and Ho Ho Lun at SPW Prove 3. On the 10th of May, 2015, Onslaught was forced to relinquish their tag team championships due to Trexxus's national service commitments. The duo would be joined by Destroyer Dharma, who become an ally of Trexxus.

SPW Southeast Asian Champion (2017-2018) 
In 2017, tensions would rise with his tag team partner, Tang. The two faced each other in January, and Tang lost his SPW Southeast Asian Championship to Trexxus at SPW Unchained In Changi, becoming the youngest ever SPW SEA Champion, at just 21 years old. In March, Trexxus defeated Jason Lee at SPW: Painfully Famous, retaining his championship. In October, Trexxus defeated Masahiro Takanashi to retain his championship. In December, Trexxus defeated EK Baki, retaining his championship once again. In February of 2018, Trexxus faced Lokomotiv, however the match ended in DQ after Trexxus used his title belt to strike Lokomotiv. GM Carl Hella restarted the match, but this time it was a chairs match, which resulted in Lokomotiv defeating Trexxus, to win his SEA championship.

Championship pursuits and final feuds (2018-2021) 
In 2018, Trexxus would team with Tang and Aiden Rex to defeat the trio of Pete Dunne, Wolfgang and Mark Davis in a 3 on 3 match. In his final years in SPW, he chased the SPW SEA Championship many times, participating in rivalries with Aiden Rex and The Statement. Trexxus attempted to win the SEA belt for the second time at SPW Atonement in a four way against Jake de Leon, Lokomotiv and Tang, however, Tang would win the bout. In 2019, he would take part in a 6-man tag team match alongside Tang, and Da Butcherman where they would face Cima, Shaolin Monk and world-renowned wrestler, Kenny Omega. Later that year Trexxus and Da Butcherman would lose to Tang, in a three-way for the SEA title at SPW Suplex City. In February of 2020, Trexxus faced Aiden Rex in his final live SPW match. At SPW Prove: Alive & Kicking #1, Dharma would turn on Onslaught, teaming with Aiden Rex to defeat Tang and Trexxus. In May 2021, at SPW Prove: Alive & Kicking #5, Trexxus wrestled his final match in SPW in a SPW Southeast Asian Title vs Career Match against The Statement, where he was ultimately defeated after a long and grueling match, officially exiting the promotion after nearly 9 years.

WWE NXT (2021-present) 
In 2019, Tan was invited for WWE tryouts in Shanghai, alongside Andruew Tang, and Alexis Lee. During the tryout Tan would appear of WWE social media, stating he wanted to one day be a WWE Hall of Famer. He was recruited immediately after the tryouts, but only went to Orlando, Florida in April 2021 after he had completed his studies and a delay due to COVID-19 pandemic.

Tan debuted on 22 September 2021 on the NXT brand under the ring name "Dante Chen", winning his first match against Trey Baxter on the newly renamed show, NXT 2.0 . Dante Chen debuted on the 205 Live brand on 1 October 2021, winning his first match on the show and second in WWE, against Malik Blade. Chen was absent from WWE television for 4 months due to a leg injury and his father's passing. After returning in 2022, Chen was attacked by Australian wrestler, Duke Hudson. Chen would feud with Hudson during the first months of 2022, ultimately losing in their singles match. Chen made his debut on NXT Level Up, against Javier Bernal in March 2022. Chen continued on NXT Level Up, participating in a feud with Bodhi Hayward, where he would win the first match in March, and lose the second in April. Over the course of April and May, Chen would lose six matches in a row, to various wrestlers including, Xyon Quinn and Sanga. In an effort to win, Chen would form a tag team with Javier Bernal in May, however the duo would lose all three of their tag matches, extending his losing streak to nine in a row. On the July 8 edition of NXT Level Up, he defeated Myles Borne, ending his losing streak . However, Chen lost to the debuting Axiom the following week. Despite this, on the August 5 edition of NXT Level Up, Chen would team up with Guru Raaj against Bryson Montana and Damaris Griffin, where he would pick up his first tag team victory in NXT. In October at a NXT Live Event, Dante Chen would dress up as Rhea Ripley, going viral on social media as he competed in the Halloween Battle Royal Royal. On the November 29 edition of NXT, Dante Chen would be defeated by Dijak. Dabba-Kato would defeat Chen in his return match to NXT. On the 13th of March, Chen made his debut on WWE Main Event, where he would be defeated by Cedric Alexander.

Personal life 
Tan's favorite wrestler is Shawn Michaels, and people used to refer to him as "Sean Michaels" after he would introduce himself. Tan says he does not have a specific dream match, instead his dream match is any match for a championship and his current goal is to become a champion in NXT. Tan has said he wishes to face The Miz.

Tan lived in Singapore for 25 years until in 2021. He would move to Orlando, Florida after being signed by the WWE.

Tan's father, Patrick Tan passed away peacefully on 8 November 2021, resulting in Tan taking an absence from WWE television.

Championships and accomplishments 

 Singapore Pro Wrestling
 SPW Southeast Asian Championship (1 time) 
 SPW Southeast Asian Tag Team Championships (1 time) - with Andruew Tang

References

External links 
 
 
 Dante Chen on WWE.com https://www.wwe.com/superstars/dante-chen

Living people
Singaporean expatriates in the United States
Singaporean male professional wrestlers
21st-century professional wrestlers
1996 births